Cristalloidophora is a genus of parasitic alveolates of the phylum Apicomplexia.

There is one species in this genus - Cristalloidophora dodecaceriae.

History
The species and genus was described in 1934 by Dehorne.

Description
This species infects the digestive tract of the polychaete shell worm Dodecaceria.

References

Apicomplexa genera
Monotypic SAR supergroup genera